Barton Arcade is a Victorian shopping arcade in Manchester, England, located between Deansgate and St Ann's Square. 

The arcade was listed as a Grade II* listed building on the 25 January 1972. The listing includes the "block of shops (Barton's Building) and offices enclosing the arcades." It was constructed by Corbett, Raby and Sawyer in 1871.  
Hartwell describes the Barton's Building facade as "utterly ignorant.. the ground floor pilasters must be seen to be believed."  The arcade, however, is "a gorgeous glass and iron shopping arcade with glass domes..., the best example of this type of cast-iron and glass arcade anywhere in the country."  
The entrance to the arcade on St Ann's Square incorporates a large, cast iron and glass wall. The two entrances on Deansgate are hidden behind the Barton Building. The building is of "four storeys with an attic, a long nine-bay facade to Deansgate, divided in half horizontally by a balustraded balcony".  The structure is composed of cast iron and glass. The iron work was supplied by the Saracen Foundry in Glasgow. 
The building was one of the first to be built on the newly widened Deansgate. The arcade was restored in the 1980s. The original shop fronts and decorative floor no longer exist.

The building sustained damage and the dome was shattered during the Manchester Blitz in December 1940.

In 1957 the Barton Arcade was sold privately for a sum "in the region of £200,000" for 12 shops and three floors of offices and showrooms. It was bought by an insurance company and Town and City Properties Ltd. The total net floor area was 55,000 sq ft and in 1957 the rent roll was about £17,000 a year. It is named after its original developer.

See also
Grade II* listed buildings in Greater Manchester

Notes

References

Grade II* listed buildings in Manchester
Commercial buildings completed in 1871
Shopping centres in Manchester
Shopping arcades in England
Grade II* listed retail buildings
Shopping malls established in 1871